Afonso of Braganza (in Portuguese Afonso), (1402? – 9 August 1460) was the eldest son of Afonso, 1st Duke of Braganza, natural son of King John I of Portugal, and of his wife, Beatriz Pereira Alvim, the only daughter of Nuno Álvares Pereira and Leonor de Alvim.

Life 
Through a formal document dated 4 April 1422, his maternal grandfather, the Constable Nuno Álvares Pereira, granted to him the County of Ourém.  However, this grant only gained the Portuguese King Edward's royal confirmation on 24 November 1433.

Alphonse was sent by the King as his special ambassador to the Council of Basel (1436) and to the Council of Florence (1439), during which time he also visited Ferrara and Rome.

In a document issued on 11 October 1451, King Afonso V of Portugal granted him the title of Marquis of Valença. He was the first Portuguese nobile to be made a Marquis.

During October 1451, he escorted Infanta Eleanor of Portugal (King Edward's daughter) on her journey from Lisbon to Livorno, where she met her betrothed, Frederick III, Holy Roman Emperor. They were married in Rome, with Pope Nicholas V blessing their marriage.

In 1458, Alphonse took part in the Portuguese expedition to north Africa which led to the capture of the Moroccan city of Alcácer Ceguer (Al Qsar as-Seghir).

Alphonse had a natural son with Dona Beatriz de Sousa (it is said that they were secretly married). This son, Afonso de Portugal, was required to join the clergy by King John II of Portugal.  Afonso de Portugal was appointed Bishop of Évora.  He had a natural son named Francisco de Portugal (Francis of Portugal) who was later appointed as Francis I, 1st Count of Vimioso, from whom Counts of Vimioso descend.

Ancestry

See also
House of Braganza
Duke of Braganza
List of Marquesses in Portugal
List of Countships in Portugal

References

Bibliography  
 
 

House of Braganza
1400 births
1460 deaths
15th-century Portuguese people
Portuguese nobility